Puerto Quetzal is Guatemala's largest Pacific Ocean port.  It is important for both cargo traffic and as a stop-off point for cruise liners. 

It is located in Escuintla department, alongside the city of Puerto San José, which it superseded as a port in importance to the country's maritime traffic during the 20th century.

See also
 Transport in Guatemala

External links
 
 Puerto Quetzal Port Authority
http://www.puerto-quetzal.com/web/guest/inicio

Populated places in the Escuintla Department
Ports and harbours of Guatemala
Port settlements in Central America